Vladivostok International Airport ( Mezhdunarodnyi aeroport Vladivostok)  is an international airport located near Artyom, Primorsky Krai, Russia, roughly an hour's drive north of the center of the city of Vladivostok. It was formerly known as Knevichi Airport, named after the village of Knevichi.

History
The Vladivostok Airport was constructed in 1931 near the town of Artyom. Commercial flights began in the summer of 1932. In the decade after World War II, Po-2 and W-2 planes were widely used in air-chemical works and coastal exploration for fish in the service of geologists and forest patrols. Passenger flights on the Moscow - Vladivostok route began in 1948 using Ilyushin Il-12s.

From 1959 to 1964, a complex of ground facilities was built to allow regular flights with larger planes after the closure of the Vtoraya Rechka Airport, encroached by the growing city.

Expansion and modernization
Domestic Terminal B of the Vladivostok airport underwent complete renovation during 2005–2006, which transformed it into one of the most comfortable and up-to-date airport terminals in Russia.  The renovated terminal was re-opened on December 19, 2006.

The federal and regional governments announced plans to rebuild Vladivostok International Airport prior to the APEC Russia 2012 Summit on Russky Island, south of Vladivostok. A new terminal (Terminal A) was built in 2012, at a cost of 7 billion RUB. The capacity of this new terminal building is 3.5 million passengers per year.

The Terminal B has since closed and converted to an exhibition center.

Facilities

The airport consists of two passenger terminals: the old Domestic Terminal B and the new International Terminal A. It has two associated airfields, Lake Springs and Knevichi.

Lake Springs Airfield
The Lake Springs airfield (approximately 2 miles south-west of the main terminal) was designed for aircraft operating on regional routes. Currently, it is not used for regularly scheduled flights, and local aviation operates from there, instead.

Knevichi
The Knevichi airfield was designed for all types of aircraft and has two hard surface runways.

Airlines and destinations

Statistics

Annual traffic

Transportation

Rail  
 
Between 2012 and 2015, Aeroexpress used to go between Vladivostok Railway Station to Knevichi Airport. This was done for APEC Summit. However, even before the crisis that has occurred since 2014, the Aeroexpress did not bring enough demand, running at the constant loss, due to a high fare and heavily automobilized population: most locals could rely on friends and family members to give them a ride, or had their own cars parked at the airport. Additionally, several bus routes offered the ride for significantly lower cost than the express, drawing off some of the visitors who found the rail and taxi fares excessive. In 2015, Aeroexpress shut down its service to the airport, and was replaced by an ordinary commuter express run by the regional commuter rail company "Express Primorya", with reduced cost and frequency to match the demand and save on the expenses of the operator.

See also
List of the busiest airports in Russia
List of the busiest airports in the former USSR

References

External links
 
 
 
 Airport information on the Vladivostok Avia website
  Airport Vladivostok Aviateka.Handbook

Airports in Primorsky Krai
Buildings and structures in Vladivostok
Transport in Vladivostok
Basel Aero